Callionymus aagilis, the slow dragonet, is a species of dragonet native to the Indian Ocean around Réunion and Mauritius.  This species grows to a length of  SL.

References 

A
Fish described in 1999
Taxa named by Ronald Fricke